Robert G. Morgan (born 1947) is an American former baseball player and coach. As a player at Ohio University (Athens, OH) he never lost a game in his collegiate history. Robert was then drafted out of Ohio University to the Detroit Tigers. He served as the head baseball coach at the College of Wooster from 1976 to 1981, Kent State University from 1982 to 1983, and Indiana University Bloomington from 1984 to 2005, compiling a career college baseball coaching record of 1074-583-6. Morgan played Minor League Baseball in the Detroit Tigers organization.

Head coaching record

References

1947 births
Living people
Baseball pitchers
Indiana Hoosiers baseball coaches
Kent State Golden Flashes baseball coaches
Lakeland Tigers players
Ohio Bobcats baseball players
Wooster Fighting Scots baseball coaches